The Albanian Cup is the main "knockout" competition in Albanian football. The competition started in 1939 as Kupa e Mbretit (English:"The King's Cup"). Just after a year the cup was suspended as the Second World War started. It started again in 1948 as "Kupa e Republikes" (English: "Republic Cup") and from 1991 as "Kupa e Shqipërisë" (Albanian Cup). Today it is the second most important competition in Albania after the Kategoria Superiore.

The winners of the Cup automatically earn the right to participate in the 1st qualifying round of the Europa Conference League.

Finals results

Performances by club

Appearances
At least 20 Cup appearances.

See also
Superkupa e Shqipërisë

References

RSSSF
Albania Cup

External links
  League321.com – National cup results. 
 http://www.calciomondialeweb.it/EUR/ALB/AlbaniaCoppa.htm
 SOCCERWAY– Albanian Cup summary. 

 
1
Albania
Recurring sporting events established in 1939
1939 establishments in Albania